Boath or Bonthala (old name) is a mandal in Adilabad district of Telangana State, India.

Geography
It has an average elevation of 418 meters (1374 feet).

Demographics
According to Indian census, 2001, the demographic details of Boath mandal is as follows:
 Total population: 42,766 in 8,898 households.	
 Male population: 21,359; female population: 21,407		
 Children under 6 years of age: 6,534 (3,297 boys and 3,237 girls)
 Total literates: 19,673

Tourist attractions
 Kuntala Waterfall
 Pochara Waterfall
 Venkataeshwara Temple 
 Boath Project
 Sai baba Temple
 Kailash Tekdi

Villages
The villages in Boath mandal include: Anduru, Babera, Boath, Chintalbori, Dhannur, Ghanpur, Kangutta, Karathwada, Kowtha, Kuchalapur, Marlapalle, Nigini, Pardi, Patnapur, Pochera, Pippaldhari, Sakhera, Sonala and Wajar.

References 

Mandals in Adilabad district